In alternative medicine, bodywork is any therapeutic or personal development technique that involves working with the human body in a form involving manipulative therapy, breath work, or energy medicine. Bodywork techniques also aim to assess or improve posture, promote awareness of the "bodymind connection" which is an approach that sees the human body and mind as a single integrated unit, or to manipulate the electromagnetic field alleged to surround the human body and affect health.

Forms 
Some of the best known forms of non-touch bodywork methods include: reiki, yoga, pranayama, as well as other non-touch methods: breathwork respiration techniques, therapeutic touch, the Bates method for sight training, qigong, and t'ai chi.

The better known forms of manipulative bodywork include the Bowen technique, chiropractic, reflexology, Rolfing, postural integration, shiatsu, and the Trager approach. There are also some methods that use light touch (not tissue work) to retrain movement patterns or shift awareness of the body, including the Alexander technique, the Feldenkrais method, the Hakomi method, integrative body psychotherapy, craniosacral therapy, and somatic experiencing.

Massage

One form of bodywork is deep tissue massage therapy, and the terms massage and bodywork are often used interchangeably. While bodywork includes all forms of massage techniques, it also includes many other types of touch therapies.

Statistics in the United States
According to a 2002 survey of adults in the United States by the National Center for Complementary and Integrative Medicine (NCCIH) and the National Center for Health Statistics (NCHS):

 Acupuncture was used by 4.0% of the population, with 1.1% having used it in the last year.
 Chiropractic was used by 19.9% of the population, with 7.5% having used it in the last year.
 Deep breathing exercises were used by 14.6% of the population, with 11.6% having used the technique in the last year.
 Yoga was used by 7.5% of the population, with 5.1% having used it in the last year.
 T'ai chi was used by 2.5% of the population, with 1.3% having used it in the last year.
 Qigong was used by 0.5% of the population, with 0.3% having used it in the last year.
 Energy healing and reiki were used by 1.1% of the population, with 0.5% having used it in the last year.

See also 
Somatics
Energy medicine

References

Manual therapy
Mind–body interventions
Massage therapy